Ali Baba and 40 Thieves is a maze arcade video game released by Sega in 1982. Players take the role of the famous Arabian hero who must fend off and kill the forty thieves who are trying to steal his money. The game is based on the folk tale of the same name. It was ported to the MSX platform, and then a Vector-06C port was made based on the MSX version.

Legacy
A clone for the ZX Spectrum was published by Suzy Soft in 1985 under the name Ali Baba.

References

External links
Ali Baba and 40 Thieves at Arcade History

Ali Baba and 40 Thieves playable at the Internet Archive

1982 video games
Arcade video games
Works based on Ali Baba
Maze games
MSX games
Sega arcade games
Video games based on Arabian mythology
Video games developed in Japan